Graham Macdonald Robb FRSL (born 2 June 1958, Manchester) is a British author and critic specialising in French literature.

Biography 

Born at Manchester, Robb attended the Royal Grammar School, Worcester, before going up to Exeter College, Oxford to read Modern Languages and graduating with first-class honours in 1981 (BA (Oxon) proceeding MA).
In 1982, Robb entered Goldsmiths' College, London to undertake teacher training, before pursuing postgraduate studies at Vanderbilt University in Tennessee where he received a PhD in French literature. He was then awarded a junior research fellowship at Exeter College in the University of Oxford (1987–1990), before leaving academia.

Robb won the 1997 Whitbread Best Biography Award for Victor Hugo, and was shortlisted for the Samuel Johnson Prize for Rimbaud in 2001. Unlocking Mallarmé had won the Modern Language Association Prize for Independent Scholars in 1996. All three of his biographies (Victor Hugo, Rimbaud and Balzac) became The New York Times "Best Books of the Year". The Discovery of France by Robb won the Duff Cooper Prize in 2007 and the RSL Ondaatje Prize in 2008. In The Discovery of Middle Earth: Mapping the Lost World of the Celts (2013), he ventures that the ancient Celts organized their territories, determined the locations of settlements and battles, and set the trajectories of tribal migrations by establishing a network of solstice lines based on an extension of the Greek system of klimata; as evidence he presented artistic geometries, road surveying, centuriations and other archaeologically attested pre-Roman alignments.

Elected a Fellow of the Royal Society of Literature in 1998, Dr Robb was appointed a Chevalier of the Ordre des Arts et des Lettres in 2009. Following the publication of his French translation of Parisians: An Adventure History of Paris, he was awarded the Medal of the City of Paris in 2012.

He and fellow academic, Margaret Hambrick, married in 1986.

Bibliography 

 
Baudelaire lecteur de Balzac (1988),  
Baudelaire (1989), translation of 1987 French text by Prof. Claude Pichois
La Poésie de Baudelaire et la poésie française, 1838–1852 (1993), criticism 
Balzac: A Biography (1994), 
Unlocking Mallarmé (1996), 
Victor Hugo (1997), 
Rimbaud (2000), 
Strangers: Homosexual Love in the 19th Century (2003), 
The Discovery of France. A Historical Geography from the Revolution to the First World War (2007), illustrated, 454 pp. W. W. Norton 
Parisians: An Adventure History of Paris (2010), W. W. Norton 
The Ancient Paths: Discovering the Lost Map of Celtic Europe, ; US title: The Discovery of Middle Earth: Mapping the Lost World of the Celts, 
Cols and Passes of the British Isles (2016), 
The Debatable Land: The Lost World Between Scotland and England (2018), 
  France an adventure history (2022)

Book reviews

See also 
 Royal Society of Literature

References

External links 
 List of Dr Robb's contributions to The New York Review of Books
 List of Dr Robb's contributions to the London Review of Books
Celtic Paths, Illuminated by a Sundial : Graham Robb’s Theory on Celtic Migrations, Rachel Donadio, The New York Times, 18 November 2013.

1958 births
Living people
English people of Scottish descent
People educated at the Royal Grammar School Worcester
Alumni of Exeter College, Oxford
Vanderbilt University alumni
Alumni of Goldsmiths, University of London
English biographers
Writers from Manchester
Fellows of the Royal Society of Literature
Costa Book Award winners
English non-fiction writers
English literary historians
Historians of French literature
Historians of Paris
Celtic studies scholars
Chevaliers of the Ordre des Arts et des Lettres